The Saturn IB-A was a proposed Saturn I family variant but was never built. It was to be a three-stage rocket virtually identical in layout to the Saturn IB-CE, with upgraded H-1 engines and a stretched S-IVB stage.

External links
 astronautix.com

Apollo program
IB-A